Kristina Kuusk (born 16 November 1985) is an Estonian épée fencer.

Career
Kuusk began fencing in 1992, coached by Helen Nelis-Naukas, Boris Joffe and Kaido Kaaberma. From 2017, Kuusk began training under Peeter Nelis. She has won team épée gold medals at the 2013 and the 2016 European Fencing Championships and a team épée silver at the 2014 World Fencing Championships. In 2013, 2014 and 2017, Kuusk was named to the Estonian Sports Team of the Year.

References

External links

1985 births
Living people
Estonian female épée fencers
Olympic fencers of Estonia
Fencers at the 2016 Summer Olympics
Sportspeople from Haapsalu
20th-century Estonian women
21st-century Estonian women